Émile Grémaux (1893 – 18 September 1959, in Lille) – boxer, coach and businessman. Long serving President of the French Boxing Federation.  First President of International Amateur Boxing Association (AIBA) (1946–1959). Vice-President of the Olympic French Committee (1952–1959).

E. Grémaux was the Champion of the Northern France in the weight of feather-cock in 1914.

He died at Lille, France, where he lived, at the age of 66, after a long illness.

References

1893 births
1959 deaths
French male boxers
Lightweight boxers
French referees and umpires
Boxing people